Syrisca is a genus of spiders in the family Miturgidae. It was first described in 1886 by Simon. , it contains 9 species.

Species
Syrisca comprises the following species:
Syrisca albopilosa Mello-Leitão, 1941
Syrisca arabs Simon, 1906
Syrisca drassiformis Strand, 1906
Syrisca longicaudata Lessert, 1929
Syrisca mamillata Caporiacco, 1941
Syrisca patagonica (Boeris, 1889)
Syrisca pictilis Simon, 1886
Syrisca russula Simon, 1886
Syrisca senegalensis (Walckenaer, 1841)

References

Miturgidae
Araneomorphae genera
Spiders of Africa
Spiders of South America